Chibed is a commune in Mureș County, Transylvania, Romania, composed of a single village, Chibed. It lies in the Székely Land, an ethno-cultural region in eastern Transylvania. The village is famous for the onion produced in the village and sold in front of the houses along the main road.

History 
The village was historically part of the Székely Land in Transylvania and belonged to Marosszék in the Middle Ages. In the mid-1780s as part of the Josephine administrative reform, Marosszék was integrated into Küküllő county, however, the szék-system was restored in 1790. After the suppression of the Hungarian Revolution in 1849, the village formed part of the Kibéd military sub-division of the Marosvásárhely division in the Udvarhely military district. Between 1861 and 1876, the former Marosszék was restored. As a result of the administrative reform in 1876, the village fell within Maros-Torda County in the Kingdom of Hungary. After the Treaty of Trianon of 1920, it became part of Romania and fell within Mureş-Turda County during the interwar period. In 1940, the Second Vienna Award granted the Northern Transylvania to Hungary and it was held by Hungary until 1944. After Soviet occupation, the Romanian administration returned and the village became officially part of Romania in 1947. Between 1952 and 1960, the commune fell within the Magyar Autonomous Region, between 1960 and 1968 the Mureș-Magyar Autonomous Region. In 1968, the province was abolished, and since then, the commune has been part of Mureș County, first as a component village of Ghindari and, since splitting away in 2003, as an independent commune.

Demography

According to the 2011 census the commune has a population of 1,765 of which 1,693 or 95.92% are Székely Hungarians.

In 1910, the village had  Hungarian inhabitants which made up 100.00% of the population. 
In 1930, the census indicated  Hungarians (95.50%), 108 Gypsies (4.22%) and  Romanians (0.23%). In 2002, beside  Hungarians (99.72%), the village also had  Romanian (0.28%) inhabitants. At this time,  households were registered along with  residential buildings. In 2007, the village had 1721 inhabitants.

Twinnings 
The village is twinned with:

  Bakonyszombathely, Hungary
  Szatymaz, Hungary
  Zalalövő, Hungary

See also 
 List of Hungarian exonyms (Mureș County)

Gallery

External links 
Map of Mures County

References

Communes in Mureș County
Localities in Transylvania
Székely communities